Castelvecchio Calvisio is a comune and town in the Province of L'Aquila in the Abruzzo region of Italy. It is located in the  Gran Sasso e Monti della Laga National Park.

The 2010 film Bad Mom's Christmas has scenes set there. The town is referenced in The American (2010 film).

References

Cities and towns in Abruzzo